Char-e-Anjir is a town in Afghanistan. It is located just outside Lashkar Gah in Helmand Province.

See also
 Helmand Province

Populated places in Helmand Province